William King Hale (December 24, 1874 – August 15, 1962) was an American cattleman and convicted murderer. Hale was a prominent figure on the Osage Indian Reservation, in what was then the Indian Territory, where he built the noted Hale Ranch and made a fortune raising cattle. When Oklahoma gained statehood in 1907, the land occupied by the reservation became contiguous with Osage County, Oklahoma.

A power player on the Osage reservation, Hale rose to local prominence through years of bribery, extortion, and intimidation. In 1921, he ordered the murders of his nephew's wife's sister and mother, followed by her cousin, another sister, and brother-in-law two years later, to gain control of their oil rights.

Early life
Little seems to have been written about William Hale's early life, other than that he was born in Greenville, Texas. He apparently came to the Osage Indian Reservation just before the turn of the 20th century.

Thomas B. White, special agent in charge, wrote in a 1932 memo to FBI Director J. Edgar Hoover: "Eventually (Hale) became a millionaire, who dominated local politics and seemingly could not be punished for any of the many crimes which were laid at his door...His method of building up power and prestige was to put various individuals under obligation to him by means of gifts and favors shown to them. Consequently, he had a tremendous following in the vicinity composed not only of the riffraff element which had drifted in, but of many good and substantial citizens."

Murders for money
Hale and his nephews, Ernest and Bryan Burkhart, conspired to kill several Osage Native Americans for their oil headrights. Ernest married Mollie Kile (or Kyle), a native Osage. Through various permutations, Hale had Mollie's sister Anna Brown killed in 1921. Anna's headrights were inherited by her mother Lizzie Q and Mollie. The death of Lizzie Q and several cousins left Mollie and therefore Ernest as heirs to the headrights, which were worth several hundred thousand dollars in the 1920s. Mollie fell ill and was later discovered to have been poisoned, but recovered when she moved away. She divorced Ernest afterward, and their children inherited Mollie's estate.

Investigations
The Osage Tribal Council suspected Hale in the murders early on, but could not elicit any testimony from the townspeople, many of whom he had bribed or threatened into silence. The council turned to the Bureau of Investigation (BOI) later renamed the Federal Bureau of Investigation (FBI), who sent four undercover agents to the Reservation. Over the next few years, these agents gained the townspeople's trust enough that they began speaking out against Hale. Hale's nephew, whom he had coerced into helping with the scheme, eventually confessed. Charges were finally brought against Hale, as well as the contract killer he had hired to perform the murders and Hale's corrupt attorney. In 1929, Hale was convicted of ordering the murders and imprisoned.

Conviction and later life
After four trials, Hale was convicted before a federal court in 29 October 1929 for only one killing - that of the shooting death of Anna Brown's cousin, Henry Roan, and sent to the Leavenworth Penitentiary in Kansas. Hale had attempted to cash in a $25,000 insurance policy on Roan's life only a week after the man's death; obligingly, Hale had also served as one of Roan's pallbearers. He was sentenced to life but was paroled on July 31, 1947. He spent some of his life in Montana, working as a ranch hand for Benny Binion. He died in Arizona in 1962 and was buried in Wichita, Kansas.

Bryan Burkhart turned state's evidence and never served time. His brother Ernest was sentenced in state court to life in prison and was sent to Oklahoma State Penitentiary in McAlester. He was released in 1959 and received a pardon in 1966 from Governor Henry Bellmon.

See also
 Osage Indian murders
 David Grann. Killers of the Flower Moon (2017) reports Hale as mastermind of murders with detailed evidence
 Linda Hogan. Mean Spirit (1991) presents fictional yet historically accurate account of murders based on FBI files

References

External links
FBI Pressroom: Murder and Mayhem in the Osage Hills
Freedom of Information Act documents on the Osage Indian Murders
Morrison v State Appellate Court ruling

1874 births
1962 deaths
1921 murders in the United States
Osage Nation
American cattlemen
American people convicted of murder
People convicted of murder by the United States federal government
People paroled from life sentence
American prisoners sentenced to life imprisonment
Prisoners sentenced to life imprisonment by the United States federal government
Criminals from Oklahoma
People from Hunt County, Texas